Quéré is a family name which means cordwainer in Breton (Kere). It may refer to:
 Catherine Quéré (born 1948), a member of the National Assembly of France
 Christian Quéré (1955–2006), French footballer
 Françoise Quéré ( Rosette, born 1959), a French actress

Breton-language surnames
Occupational surnames